Reverend Maximin Alff, SS.CC., was born in Treves, Belgium, on 24 July 1866.  He made his profession in the Congregation of the Sacred Hearts of Jesus and Mary on 6 July 1867.  He studied at the Catholic University of Leuven and was ordained to the presbyterate on 24 August 1890.  He was subsequently appointed as professor of theology at Miranda de Ebro in Spain, from 1892 until 1894.  He was then sent to the Vicariate Apostolic of the Hawaiian Islands, arriving in Honolulu on 25 October 1894.  He served as parochial vicar in Kona, Kaua'i, Hana and Wailuku.  In 1912, he was elected provincial superior.  He died on 1 January 1927 and was buried in the Honolulu Catholic Cemetery.

1866 births
1927 deaths
19th-century Belgian Roman Catholic priests
20th-century American Roman Catholic priests
Hawaii Catholic priests
Picpus Fathers
19th-century American Roman Catholic priests